Eviction is the removal of a tenant from rental property by the landlord.  In some jurisdictions it may also involve the removal of persons from premises that were foreclosed by a mortgagee (often, the prior owners who defaulted on a mortgage).

Depending on the laws of the jurisdiction, eviction may also be known as unlawful detainer, summary possession, summary dispossess, summary process, forcible detainer, ejectment, and repossession, among other terms.  Nevertheless, the term eviction is the most commonly used in communications between the landlord and tenant.  Depending on the jurisdiction involved, before a tenant can be evicted, a landlord must win an eviction lawsuit or prevail in another step in the legal process. It should be borne in mind that eviction, as with ejectment and certain other related terms, has precise meanings only in certain historical contexts (e.g., under the English common law of past centuries), or with respect to specific jurisdictions. In present-day practice and procedure, there has come to be a wide variation in the content of these terms from jurisdiction to jurisdiction.

The legal aspects, procedures, and provisions for eviction, by whatever name, vary even between countries or states with similar legal structures.

The eviction process 

Most jurisdictions do not permit the landlord to evict a tenant without first taking legal action to do so (commonly referred to as a "self-help" eviction; such actions include changing locks, removing items from the premises, or terminating utility services).  Such evictions are generally illegal at any time during the process (including after a landlord wins an eviction suit); a tenant facing such measures may sue the landlord. However, self-help evictions may be permitted in some jurisdictions when commercial tenants are involved, as opposed to residential tenants.

Notice 
Prior to filing a suit in court for eviction, generally the landlord must provide written notice to the tenant (commonly called a notice to quit or notice to vacate). The residential and commercial ordinances created jurisdictions preventing landlords from taking any action that may force a tenant out of their premises. These actions include, but are not limited to, force and threats, removing essential services, demolishing the property, or interfering with entrance locks.

Lawsuit and trial 
If the tenant remains in possession of the property after the notice to vacate has expired, the landlord can then serve the tenant with a lawsuit.

Depending on the jurisdiction, the tenant may be required to submit a written response by a specified date, after which time another date is set for the trial.  Other jurisdictions may simply require the tenant to appear in court on a specified date.  Eviction cases are often expedited since the issue is time-sensitive (the landlord loses rental income while the tenant remains in possession).  A jury trial may be requested by either party, however until the late 2000s that was very uncommon.

Many of the defendants in eviction case do not show up for court. In many major cities, including Milwaukee, as many as 70% of defendants are no-shows. In the courts in some urban areas only 10% of defendants showed up.

Removal from the property 
As mentioned above, most jurisdictions do not allow a landlord to evict a tenant without legal action being taken first, even if the landlord is successful in court.

Instead, the landlord would have to obtain a writ of possession or warrant of removal from the court and present it to the appropriate law enforcement officer.  The officer then posts a notice for the tenant on the property that the officer will remove the tenant and any other people on the property, though some jurisdictions will not enforce the writ if, on that day, inclement weather is taking place.

With the removal of the tenant also comes the removal of their personal belongings. If the tenant leaves behind anything of value, there is a custom (but no law in some jurisdictions) for the landlord to hold onto their left-behind belongings for 30 days. After these 30 days the landlord is able to sell the left-behind property, usually in an auction, to satisfy any overdue rent arrears.

No-fault evictions
A no-fault eviction occurs when a landlord seeks to regain possession of a rented property under laws that do not require him to allege any fault on the part of the tenant such as failure to pay rent, disturbance to neighbors or other tenants in the building, or violation of lease terms. In many jurisdictions, a tenancy at will, as opposed to a term lease tenancy, may be ended at any time with a minimum of thirty days' notice to tenant, although some jurisdictions require longer notice periods..

As gentrification and the re-population of urban centers by wealthier residents takes place, no-fault evictions are used as a tool to displace tenants in cities with rent control.  In California, for example, the Ellis Act allows eviction of rent-controlled tenants if the landlord intends to no longer rent any portion of an apartment building (i.e., landlords cannot be compelled to rent). The Ellis Act has been applied to rentals in San Francisco, Santa Monica and Los Angeles.

Just-cause evictions

Some areas have "just cause eviction" laws, which prevents evictions for reasons other than an approved list.  For example, the law in Seattle, Washington, requires a court order (and in some cases relocation assistance) and allows evictions for:
 Failure to pay rent or late payments after written warning more than four times per year
 The tenant has failed to correct a violation of the lease or laws concerning public nuisance, sanitation, unlawful business, or habitually causes warnings to be issued with corrections made
 The owner's family is moving into the unit, and no adequate other units are available
 The sale of a single-family home
 Tenant-employees who are no longer employees
 Renovation, demolition, or conversion to non-residential use
 Violation of a legal requirement, such as building suitability or number of occupants
 Tenants who live with the owner
 If drug or health and safety-related crimes are committed (by the tenant or with the tenant's consent) on the property, street, or neighboring properties

Massachusetts law allows landlords to evict leased tenants only if one of three conditions are met:
 Failure to pay rent
 Violation of the terms of the lease agreement by the tenant
 Excessive damage caused to the rental property by the tenant or persons under the tenant's control

Real estate mobbing 
Real estate mobbing, also known as property mobbing, is the use of mobbing (group bullying) techniques by real estate speculators to constructively or forcibly evict a resident from their dwelling. The United Nations has recognized real estate mobbing as a worldwide cause of forced eviction. Real estate mobbing is acknowledged as a problem in Europe and particularly in Spain.

Countries

United States 

In the United States of America, rules for evictions and the eviction process are determined by state, local county, and city rules.

Australia 

If the tenant is on a fixed term tenancy and their lease is coming to an end, a landlord will be required to give them a valid notice to vacate. The period of this notice varies from state to state. If the tenant will not cooperate with the parameters of an eviction notice, application is made to the Tenancy Tribunal for possession of the property.

A landlord cannot legally evict a tenant without obtaining a Possession Order and a Warrant of Possession. A Warrant of Possession directs the police to evict a tenant from the property. The police then contact the agent to arrange a time to go to the property, see the tenants off the premises, change the locks and formally take possession. The eviction must always be carried out by the police; the landlord cannot evict tenants themselves. Taking the law into own hands and failing to act according to the relevant legislation in jurisdiction will carry penalties for a landlord.

On March 29, 2020, Prime Minister Scott Morrison revealed that state and territories governments will be moving to put a moratorium on evictions of persons as a result of financial distress caused by the COVID-19 pandemic. The government said these measures were set to last for at least six months.

Impacts on those being evicted

There are sometimes communication problems for when the actual eviction date is decided upon, leaving some evictees thoroughly underprepared with nothing packed when the sheriff comes. This can lead to a Skinner box–like experience as evictees sometime try “riding" the eviction out. (This is sometimes caused by denial.)

Evictees experience higher rates of: depression, anxiety, high blood pressure, post-traumatic stress disorder (PTSD), and even suicide. The process of eviction can take a long time (potentially months) and this can leave the evictee in a heightened state of stress, which makes them more susceptible to stress illnesses. Even after years have passed, studies show that evictees are less happy, optimistic and energetic than those who haven't been evicted.

Being evicted can increase rates of job loss. In fact, someone is 15% more likely to be laid off after experiencing eviction. This can lead to a cycle where the eviction makes it difficult to work but not working can lead to eviction.

Evictees often end up moving into poorer quality housing, like overcrowded homes. For example, a study that looked at Milwaukee, Wisconsin, found that renters who had been involuntarily moved from a prior residence were 25% more likely to experience long-term housing problems than their peers who had only moved voluntarily.

See also
 Cure or quit
 Ejectment
 Forced evictions in China
 Foreclosure
 Forcible entry
 Lease
 Population transfer
 Quiet title
 Retaliatory eviction
 Soldal v. Cook County
 The Registry
 Unlawful eviction and harassment

References

External links

 Good Cause Eviction (CT)
 Fighting Tenants Who Fight Eviction
 New York State housing rights guide
 Renters in the Crosshairs from Dollars & Sense, March/April 2009
 The National Landlord Tenant Guide to Eviction All 50 States
 California Consumer Dept Guide

Landlord–tenant law
Personal financial problems
Forced migration
Housing